Anna River may refer to:

 Anna River (Michigan) in the Upper Peninsula of Michigan
 North Anna River in Virginia, tributary of the Pamunkey River
 South Anna River in Virginia, tributary of the Pamunkey River